The .416 Taylor is a rifle cartridge. According to Ken Waters in Pet Loads, it was created by Robert Chatfield-Taylor in the early 1970s, with the first rifle in this caliber being a factory barreled Winchester Model 70.  The case is based on the .458 Winchester Magnum necked down to accept .416 caliber bullets.

Usage
The .416 Taylor uses a  bullet diameter. The work on this caliber (performed by Waters) was done with an experimental factory Ruger Model 77. Waters also reported that  bullets could exceed  when propelled by certain listed powders. Under normal hunting conditions, the Taylor cartridge is therefore capable of taking any of the largest and most dangerous game animals in the world.

Gunsmiths are rebarreling Browning BAR .338 Winchester Magnum rifles with .416 Taylor barrels thereby creating semi-automatic hunting rifles in a true dangerous game caliber.

Origin
The cartridge was created to replace the magnum length .416 Rigby which at that time was nearly obsolete, with a cartridge that would fit into a standard length bolt-action rifle. The shorter action rifles are not only easier to carry in heavy cover, but also make it more convenient to carry more ammunition. The advantages to cartridges in .416 inch bullet diameter are that they generally present the shooter with less recoil and flatter trajectory than the larger .458 caliber dangerous game rifles (like the .458 Winchester Magnum). They also have more striking power and penetration than medium bores like the .375 H&H Magnum. The Taylor cartridge is simply a necked down .458 Winchester Magnum with no changes. They have the same shoulder height and angle as the .264 Winchester Magnum. The 416 Taylor was a SAAMI standardized cartridge, and was offered as a standard production item by A-Square until it closed in 2011.

See also
List of rifle cartridges
10 mm caliber

References

416 Taylor
Wildcat cartridges